St John the Evangelist's Church is a church in Otterburn, Northumberland, northeast England, located off the A696 road.

History

The foundation stone of Otterburn Church was laid on 28 September 1855 and it was dedicated by the Lord Bishop of Durham, Rt. Revd. Edward Maltby on 27 October 1857. Three sisters, the Misses Davidson, of Lemmington Hall, and Mrs. Askew, of Pallinsburn, built Otterburn Church, in the year 1857, for the use of their tenantry and the neighbourhood. They endowed it with £100 per annum.

Organ

The church had a two manual pipe organ by Nicholson and Newbegin dating from 1910. A specification of the organ can be found on the National Pipe Organ Register.

References

Otterburn
Otterburn, Northumberland
19th-century Church of England church buildings
Churches completed in 1857
1857 establishments in England